The 2017 African Weightlifting Championships was held in Vacoas, Mauritius between July 10 and July 20, 2017.

Medal summary
Results are obtained from the IWF website.

Men

Women

Medal table

Participating nations 

 (12)
 (2)
 (1)
 (1)
 (6)
 (1)
 (2)

 (9)
 (11)
 (16)
 (4)
 (5)
 (13)
 (1)

References

External links
 Tournament website

African Weightlifting Championships
African Weightlifting Championships
African Weightlifting Championships
International sports competitions hosted by Mauritius